Eucyclopera plagidisca is a moth of the family Erebidae first described by George Hampson in 1895. It is found in Bhutan.

References

Nudariina
Moths described in 1895